This is a list of resignations in Iceland.

Cabinet ministers
Resignations of cabinet ministers do not take effect until they have been relieved of duty by the President of Iceland.

Members of Parliament

References

Iceland